The Mount Ivohibe gecko (Lygodactylus montanus) is a species of gecko endemic to southeastern Madagascar.

References

Lygodactylus
Reptiles described in 1965
Reptiles of Madagascar
Endemic fauna of Madagascar